Major General John Beugnot Wogan (January 1, 1890 – September 30, 1968) was a decorated United States Army officer. He is most noted for his leadership of the 13th Armored Division for the most of World War II.

Military career

John B. Wogan was born on January 1, 1890, in New Orleans, Louisiana. He graduated from the United States Military Academy at West Point, New York, in 1915 as a part of The class the stars fell on. His classmates were for example Dwight D. Eisenhower, Omar Bradley, James Van Fleet, Paul J. Mueller, Charles W. Ryder and Stafford LeRoy Irwin, all big future generals of World War II.

He was commissioned a second lieutenant of coastal artillery, and his first service assignment was at Fort H. G. Wright during the years 1915–1916.

Fluent in both French and English (parents were from old New Orleans French lineage), Wogan spent extensive time in France as a staff translator for the Army of Occupation after World War 1.

In 1931, Wogan was posted to Panama as a major of Pack Artillery, and oversaw the first ever aerial deployment of artillery, using army aircraft to transport artillery from one side of the Panama Canal to the other.

In 1939, Wogan transferred service branches once again, this time to the Armored Corps. He eventually rose in rank to major general, commanding the  13th Armored division from 1942 to 1945. On April 15. 1945, Wogan fought a desperate German offensive in the Ruhr Pocket, at a German roadblock near the Autobahn interchange Leverkusen, where he was severely wounded by German rifle fire. He was forced to medically retire as a result of these wounds after a lengthy convalescence in military hospitals.

Wogan retired to his wife's hometown of Asheville, North Carolina, where he spent the remainder of his life as the director of the veterans hospital there. He was active in civic causes until his death in 1968.

Decorations

References

External links
Generals of World War II

1890 births
1968 deaths
People from New Orleans
Military personnel from Louisiana
United States Army generals
United States Army personnel of World War I
United States Military Academy alumni
Recipients of the Distinguished Service Medal (US Army)
Recipients of the Silver Star
Recipients of the Legion of Merit
Burials at Arlington National Cemetery
Graduates of the United States Military Academy Class of 1915
United States Army generals of World War II